Tezontepec is a town and one of the 84 municipalities of Hidalgo, in central-eastern Mexico. The municipality covers an area of 133.6 km², this named Villa de Tezontepec.

As of 2020, the municipality had a total population of 13,032.

References

Municipalities of Hidalgo (state)
Populated places in Hidalgo (state)